Ulex europaeus, the gorse, common gorse, furze or  whin, is a species of flowering plant in the family  Fabaceae, native to the British Isles and Western Europe.

Description

Young seedlings produce normal leaves for the first few months; these are trifoliate, resembling a small clover leaf.

They are coconut-scented. Seeds remain viable for 30 years.

Like many species of gorse, it is often a fire-climax plant, which readily catches fire but re-grows from the roots after the fire; the seeds are also adapted to germinate after slight scorching by fire. It has a tap root, lateral and adventitious roots. It can live for about thirty years.

Invasive species
The species has been introduced to other areas of Europe, and also to the Americas, New Zealand, South Africa, and Australia, where it is often considered a weed and is a serious problem invasive species in some areas (notably the western United States, Chile and New Zealand). It was introduced to New Zealand from Britain as a type of hedge, but became a major blight to farmers as the climate suited its growth better than its native habitat and many of its natural predators were absent.

Common gorse is also an invasive species in the montane grasslands of Horton Plains National Park in Sri Lanka. It outcompetes native, endemic species and is a fire hazard.

Biological pest control is used on this plant in many areas. The gorse spider mite (Tetranychus lintearius) and the gorse seed weevil (Exapion ulicis) reduce the spread of the plant.

Cultivation
This plant is used for hedging, boundary definition and groundcover in suitably sunny, open locations. Cultivars include 'Strictus' (Irish gorse), a dwarf form, and the double-flowered, non-fruiting 'Flore Pleno', which has gained the Royal Horticultural Society's Award of Garden Merit.

Uses
Bruised gorse was used in some areas for feeding to horses and other livestock.

Lectin extracted from seeds of this species binds to, is remarkably specific for, and is the standard method for identification of H substance (absent in the hh antigen system) on human red blood cells.  The vast majority of humans express H substance, which is the basis for the ABO blood group system, but a few rare individuals ("Bombay phenotype") do not—and a chemical isolated from Ulex europaeus is used to identify these individuals. This lectin is also used as a marker for human vascular endothelial cells, and as a tool for their isolation for in-vitro culture.

Like other legumes, it fixes nitrogen into the soil.

See also
 Gorse in New Zealand

References

External links

 Washington Burke Museum
 Jepson Manual Treatment
 USDA Plants Profile
 
 
 

europaeus
Flora of Europe
Invasive plant species in Sri Lanka
Nitrogen-fixing crops
Plants described in 1753
Taxa named by Carl Linnaeus